Henlow Camp was a railway station on the Bedford to Hitchin Line which served the village of Henlow in Bedfordshire, England. Opened in 1857, it gave more than a century of service before closing in 1962.

History 

The Midland Railway first opened a station named "Henlow" some distance from the village of the same name, as part of its new line from Bedford to Hitchin, part of a larger scheme to allow its Midland Main Line a direct route to London without using rival Great Northern Railway metals. Passenger traffic over the Bedford to Hitchin section was minimal and services were reduced to a shuttle by 1880. The section between Shefford and Hitchin, including Henlow, was single-tracked in 1911.

The establishment of RAF Henlow at the end of the First World War increased passenger and freight traffic through the station which was located opposite the airbase. The activity continued after the war when the base became the location of the RAF Signals Engineering Establishment, and a depot for the repair and construction of aircraft as well as a training centre for the engineers; it became the School of Aeronautical Engineering in 1924. To reflect this development, the railway station's name was changed in 1933 to "Henlow Camp".

The inter-war years saw a decline in traffic with the introduction of buses between Bedford and Hitchin. Traffic picked up again during the Second World War when troop specials were run to enable conscripts to return home from the RAF camps at Cardington and Henlow. The introduction of railbuses after the war did little to improve traffic, and the line closed in 1962.

Stationmasters

J. Heath until 1860
Benjamin Maulding 1860 - ca. 1866
John Gregory until 1872
S. Martin 1872 - 1881
John Johnson 1881 - 1888
William George Hall 1888 - 1902 (afterwards station master at Flitwick)
Thomas Oliver Baker 1902 - ca. 1911 (afterwards station master at Yate)
Robert Arthur Gill 1914 - 1921 (afterwards station master at Hemel Hempstead)
G.J. Marshall ca. 1937
Frederick William Booker ca. 1940 (also station master at Arlesey)
John F. Georgeson ca. 1946 (also station master at Shefford)

Present day 
No trace remains of the railway at Henlow, a small commercial development having been built on the trackbed.

References

External links 
 Henlow Camp station on a 1946 O.S. map

Disused railway stations in Bedfordshire
Former Midland Railway stations
Railway stations in Great Britain opened in 1857
Railway stations in Great Britain closed in 1962
Charles Henry Driver railway stations
1857 establishments in England
Camp railway station